The 2008 UEFA Intertoto Cup was the last UEFA Intertoto Cup football tournament, the 14th to be organised by UEFA and the third since the competition's format was given a major overhaul. Fifty teams were invited, with the eleven winners after the third round then advancing to the second qualifying round of the 2008–09 UEFA Cup. The draw took place at UEFA headquarters in Nyon, Switzerland on 21 April 2008. Based on the subsequent progress of the eleven co-winners in their UEFA Cup efforts, Braga is declared the outright winner of the Intertoto Cup.

Association team allocation
50 teams participated in the 2008 UEFA Intertoto Cup from 50 UEFA associations. Below is the scheme for the 2008 UEFA Intertoto Cup.  The rankings throughout are based on the 2007 UEFA coefficients.

First round:  (28 teams)
28 from associations 23–36, 38–50 and 53

Second round: (28 teams)
14 winners from the first round
14 from associations 9–22

Third round: (22 teams)
14 winners from the second round
8 from associations 1–8

First round
First leg matches were played on 21 and 22 June 2008 and second leg matches were played on 28 and 29 June 2008.

|-
!colspan="5"|Southern-Mediterranean region
|-

|-
!colspan="5"|Central-East region
|-

|-
!colspan="5"|Northern region
|-

First leg

Second leg

Ethnikos Achnas 1–1 Besa on aggregate. Besa won on away goals rule.

Grbalj 4–4 Čelik on aggregate. Grbalj won on away goals rule.

Renova won 2–0 on aggregate.

Gorica won 3–0 on aggregate.

Budapest Honvéd won 6–3 on aggregate.

Tiraspol 2–2 Mika on aggregate. Tiraspol won on away goals rule.

Nitra 3–3 Neftchi Baku on aggregate. Neftchi Baku won on away goals rule.

Shakhtyor Soligorsk won 5–1 on aggregate.

Locomotive Tbilisi 2–2 Etzella Ettelbruck on aggregate. Etzella Ettelbruck won on away goals rule.

Ekranas won 4–0 on aggregate.

Elfsborg won 4–1 on aggregate.

Bohemians won 9–3 on aggregate.

TPS Turku won 6–3 on aggregate.

Riga won 3–2 on aggregate.

Second round
The first leg was held on 5 and 6 July 2008, while the second leg was held on 12 and 13 July 2008.

|-
!colspan="5"|Southern-Mediterranean region
|-

|-
!colspan="5"|Central-East region
|-

|-
!colspan="5"|Northern region
|-

First leg

Second leg

Chernomorets Burgas won 3–1 on aggregate.

Sivasspor won 3–2 on aggregate.

Grasshopper Zürich won 5–1 on aggregate.

Bnei Sakhnin won 3–1 on aggregate.

Panionios won 3–2 on aggregate.

Neftchi Baku won 2–1 on aggregate.

Saturn Moscow Oblast won 8–1 on aggregate.

Tavriya Simferopol won 3–1 on aggregate.

Sturm Graz won 2–0 on aggregate.

Budapest Honvéd 3–3 Teplice on aggregate. Budapest Honvéd advanced on away goals rule.

Odense won 4–1 on aggregate.

Elfsborg won 4–0 on aggregate.

Rosenborg won 7–1 on aggregate.

Bohemians 2–2 Riga on aggregate. Riga advanced on the away goals rule.

Third round
The first leg was held on 19 and 20 July 2008, while the second leg was held on 26 and 27 July 2008. The 11 winners entered the second qualifying round of the UEFA Cup.

|-
!colspan="5"|Southern-Mediterranean region
|-
 

|-
!colspan="5"|Central-East region
|-

|-
!colspan="5"|Northern region
|-

First leg

Second leg

Deportivo La Coruña won 3–1 on aggregate.

Napoli won 2–0 on aggregate.

Braga won 5–0 on aggregate.

Grasshopper Zürich won 4–0 on aggregate.

Stuttgart won 3–1 on aggregate.

Vaslui won 3–2 on aggregate.

Tavriya Simferopol 1–1 Rennes on aggregate. Rennes won in a penalty shootout.

Sturm Graz won 2–1 on aggregate.

Rosenborg won 2–1 on aggregate.

Aston Villa won 3–2 on aggregate.

Elfsborg won 1–0 on aggregate.

Winners
Eight of the eleven Intertoto Cup co-winners entered the UEFA Cup by winning their qualifying ties and progressed to the first round. Five of those eight sides survived the first round and entered the Group stage. Four of those five qualified for the round of 32. Only Braga progressed to the round of 16, making them the overall winners.

The 11 co-winners were:

  Braga (Overall winners) (round of 16, lost to Paris Saint-Germain)
  Aston Villa (round of 32, lost to CSKA Moscow)
  Deportivo La Coruña (round of 32, lost to AaB)
  Stuttgart (round of 32, lost to Zenit Saint Petersburg)
  Rosenborg (Group stage, fifth in Group G)
  Napoli (First round, lost to Benfica)
  Rennes (First round, lost to Twente)
  Vaslui (First round, lost to Slavia Prague)
  Elfsborg (Second qualifying round, lost to St Patrick's Athletic)
  Grasshopper Zürich (Second qualifying round, lost to Lech Poznań)
  Sturm Graz (Second qualifying round, lost to Zürich)

See also
2008–09 UEFA Champions League
2008–09 UEFA Cup

Notes

References

External links
Official UEFA site

UEFA Intertoto Cup
3